Macedo is a musical duo consisting of identical-twin sisters Michelle Alicia and Melissa Ann Macedo.

Early life
Twin sisters Michelle and Melissa were born in Pasadena, California. Growing up in a musical family, the sisters began playing piano at age three and Michelle began playing classical guitar at age 11. The duo's primary songwriter, she began writing at an early age. Melissa is responsible for the vocal harmonies and melodies. The girls' musical influences included Zero 7, Feist, Ella Fitzgerald, Joni Mitchell and Billie Holiday. They attended an all-girl Catholic high school in Pasadena, where Michelle wrote most of the songs for her solo album La Luna.

Musical career

2007-2010: La Luna (Michelle}
During her first year of college Michelle recorded and produced her debut solo album, La Luna, for by OutTake Records in Boston. She recorded the album in ten hours, playing every instrument. The sisters separated for the first time when they attended different colleges. Melissa attended Columbia University (Barnard College) in New York City, where she received dual BA degrees in Gender Studies and Theatre. Michelle attended Emerson College in Boston, receiving a BFA in acting.

2010-2011: Flags & Boxes
In 2010 Michelle and Melissa founded MoonGold Records, and release their music on that label. 
While they were apart Michelle wrote their first album, Flags & Boxes, recorded primarily in Boston with producer Kush Mody and engineers Nils Montan and Andrew Oedel at Emerson College radio station WERS. The album was mixed by Justin Gerrish (Vampire Weekend, RaRa Riot). Its songs were inspired by the girls' college experiences and their travels in London, the Netherlands and Argentina. Each sister sings and plays several instruments,}. In live performances Michelle plays piano and guitar, and Melissa plays violin and sings. After the release of their first album, Maria Menounos of Extra told 944 Magazine that Macedo was her favorite musical group. Their music is noted for its vocal harmonies and instrumental range of instruments, including organ and French horn. and the album was reviewed in Vogue India.

2014: Paper Doll
Met with praise, Michelle and Melissa Macedo released their EP "Paper Doll" on February 4, 2014. A single from the EP, "Your Skin", was premiered by WNYC's Soundcheck. Soundcheck praised the single, saying "And with whipsmart lines like "I handed you a sentence you would never forget" and later, "I'm about to kiss my worst critic", "Your Skin" proves to be an equally catchy and emotional break-up kiss-off anthem.". "Paper Doll" was co-produced by Khris Kellow (Christina Aguilera, Patti LaBelle) 

Another single from the EP, "Like Me Most", was premiered by LadyGunn Magazine. LadyGunn describes their music, "While they look great on screen, it's their music that shines through the most. They have been compared to Fiona Apple meets Regina Spektor and at times have R+B influences and hooks that make you sing them out loud, full volume like you are saying all the things you never could to an ex.".

The third song featured was "17", which was premiered by Paste Magazine. Paste says the twins are known to be completely opposite in personalities; "The sisters may look alike, but that’s where the similarities end: each brought her own personality to their work, the result is a lesson in duality and teamwork (and a damn nice sounding one, at that).".

2017: Ghost Town 
Michelle and Melissa Macedo released their single "Ghost Town" in April, 2017 hinting that the upcoming album will be "haunting and raw".

The following single "Supernatural" was released with a music video via PulseSpikes.

Acting career
Michelle and Melissa have always had a passion for acting. While at Emerson, Michelle appeared in the lead role of Eve Vaughn in the made-for-television movie Age Appropriate, directed by Jason Perlman. Also at Emerson, she starred in Kevin Bright pilot Browne at Midnight . The twins have also appeared together on television shows, including "One Day", as characters Tick (Melissa) and Tack (Michelle).

Melissa was featured in a Pantene Pro-V commercial which also featured three songs from Flags & Boxes.

The twins also starred in a comedy Web Series "Time Lapsed" featured on Funny Or Die.

In 2015, Michelle and Melissa co-founded a theater company called, World Kin Ensemble, which produces shows that combat sexual assault on college campuses. Currently, they also tour with and act in the show, Dirty Talk.

In 2016, Michelle & Melissa both filmed starring roles in a new movie "Blood Heist" with James Franco.

Michelle & Melissa played the lead singer and guitarist of Shane's band on the Netflix show Girlboss released in April, 2017.

Discography

Albums
 Flags & Boxes (2011)
 Paper Doll (2014)

Singles
 Ghost Town (2017)
 Supernatural (2017)]
 Valentine's Day (2013)

References

External links
 

American pop girl groups